Palpifer pellicia is a moth of the family Hepialidae first described by Charles Swinhoe in 1905. It is found in India.

References

Moths described in 1905
Hepialidae